The 1933 St. Edward's Tigers football team represented St. Edward's University as a member of the Texas Conference during 1933 college football season. Led by Jack Chevigny in his first and only season as head coach, the team went 3–6–1 overall, winning the Texas Conference title with a mark of 5–1.

Schedule

References

St. Edward's
St. Edward's Crusaders football seasons
St. Edward's Tigers football